Matilla is a Chilean village and oasis in the interior of Atacama Desert. It lies four kilometers southwest of the oasis town of Pica. As of 2017 Matilla had 380 inhabitants and 217 homes. It host underground aqueducts in various states of decay. These aqueducts are locally known as socavones and tap Pica Aquifer.

In the late 19th century its inhabitants were prone to suffer typhus, ostensibly because of the poor quality the village's water source and the existence of a nearby swamp. In 1904 the village had obtained a new water supply thanks to Father Luis Friedrich's initiative and the wealthy neighbors who financed the works.

The population of Matilla is mostly of Spanish stock in contrast to Pica whose old inhabitants have more indigenous heritage.

The location became first known to Spanish after the men of Diego de Almagro reached the area in 1536 on their return to Peru. Local lore says the town was founded in 1547 by Márquez de Loayza who arrived from present-day Bolivia. Other sources give 1642 as the date of founding.

References

Oases of Chile
Populated places in El Tamarugal Province
Localities irrigated by puquios